The inaugural Greater Manchester mayoral election was held on 4 May 2017 to elect the Mayor of Greater Manchester. The next successive election was due to be held on 7 May 2020, but due to that year's outbreak of the novel Coronavirus, the election was postponed until May 2021.  Subsequent elections are legislatively required to be held every four years thereafter. The electoral system used for the election is the supplementary vote (SV).

The mayor leads the Greater Manchester Combined Authority, sitting alongside the leaders of the ten metropolitan borough councils who form the mayor's cabinet. The creation of the position was part of a devolution deal giving local government additional powers and funding, enacted via the Cities and Local Government Devolution Act 2016.  The interim mayor was Tony Lloyd, the Greater Manchester Police and Crime Commissioner. The office of police and crime commissioner was subsumed into the mayor's role.

Nominations for candidates wishing to stand in the election closed on 4 April 2017, after which the final list of candidates was published.

Electoral system
The election used the supplementary vote system, in which voters express a first and a second preference of candidates.
 If a candidate receives over 50% of the first preference vote the candidate wins.
 If no candidate receives an overall majority, i.e., over 50% of first preference votes, the top two candidates proceed to a second round and all other candidates are eliminated. 
 The first preference votes for the remaining two candidates stand in the final count. 
 Voters' ballots whose first and second preference candidates are eliminated are discarded.
 Voters whose first preference candidates have been eliminated and whose second preference candidate is in the top two have their second preference votes added to the count.

All registered electors (British, Commonwealth and European Union citizens) living in Greater Manchester aged 18 or over on 4 May 2017 were entitled to vote in the mayoral election. The deadline to register to vote in the election was midnight on 13 April 2017.

Candidates

Conservative Party 

 Sean Anstee, Trafford Council Leader and Councillor for Bowdon.

English Democrats 

 Stephen Morris, General Secretary of the Workers of England Union and North West Chairman of the English Democrats.

Green Party 

 Deyika Nzeribe was selected as the Green Party candidate. However, he died of a heart attack on 1 January 2017. Will Patterson was selected as the Green Party's new mayoral candidate.

Independents 

Mohammad Aslam, property developer who has lived in the area for 17 years. Became notable for doing his manifesto video entirely in Urdu.
Marcus Farmer – local businessman. Stood as Independent candidate in MP elections for Manchester Withington in 2010 and 2015.

Labour and Co-operative Party 

 Andy Burnham, MP for Leigh since 2001, Shadow Home Secretary 2015–16, former Shadow Secretary of State for Health from 2011 to 2015, former Secretary of State for Health from 2009 to 2010, Secretary of State for Culture, Media and Sport 2008–2009 and Candidate for Leader of the Labour Party in 2010 and 2015. Burnham was also selected by the Co-operative Party and stood for election as a joint Labour and Co-operative Party candidate.

Liberal Democrats 

 Jane Brophy is a Trafford councillor representing Timperley. Stood as a Liberal Democrat in parliamentary elections for Altrincham and Sale West in 2010, 2015 and 2017, and a by-election in Oldham West and Royton in 2015.

UKIP 

 Shneur Odze, former North West England European Parliament candidate.

Former candidates

Communist League 
 Peter Clifford was selected as the Communist League candidate. In March he withdrew his candidacy citing the cost of the deposit.

Results

Results by local authority

Bolton

Bury

Manchester

Oldham

Rochdale

Salford

Stockport

Tameside

Trafford

Wigan

References

External links 

 Home page of the interim mayor via Greater Manchester Combined Authority.
 The Greater Manchester Elects website

Politicians from Manchester
2017 English local elections
Elections in Greater Manchester
Mayoral elections in England
May 2017 events in the United Kingdom
Andy Burnham